The 2011 Nobel Prize in Literature was awarded to the Swedish poet Tomas Tranströmer (1931–2015) "because, through his condensed, translucent images, he gives us fresh access to reality." He is the seventh Swedish author to become a recipient of the prize after Harry Martinson and Eyvind Johnson who were jointly awarded in 1974.

Laureate

Tomas Tranströmer has this ability to draw out the great and wonderful from the mundane. Since his writing debut in the 1950s with 17 dikter ("17 Poems", 1954) and Hemligheter på vägen ("Secrets on the Way", 1958), Tranströmer's poetry has been characterized by its "everyday roots", and a striving after simplicity that allows room for its reader to marvel and to concentrate. His poems are marked by rich, keen and original imagery. Two of Tranströmer's greatest interests, nature and music, have also left deep impressions on his writing. His famous literary collections include Östersjöar ("Baltics", 1974), För levande och döda ("For the Living and the Dead", 1989), Sorgegondolen ("The Sorrow Gondola", 1996), and Den stora gåtan ("The Great Enigma", 2004).

Nominees
Before winning, Tranströmer was a leading contender for the 2011 Nobel Prize in Literature together with the Syrian poet Adunis according to Ladbrokes. Other authors tipped to win that same year were the Japanese writer Haruki Murakami, Algerian writer Assia Djebar, American novelists Joyce Carol Oates, Thomas Pynchon, and Cormac McCarthy, Hungarian writer Péter Nádas, Indian poets Rajendra Bhandari and K. Satchidanandan, South Korean Ko Un, Australian poet Les Murray, Romanian novelist Mircea Cărtărescu, Somali novelist Nuruddin Farah, British fantasy author J. K. Rowling, and American singer-songwriter Bob Dylan.

Reactions
Tranströmer had been considered a perennial frontrunner, together with the Syrian poet Adunis, for the award in years past, with reporters waiting near his residence on the day of the announcement in prior years. The Swedish Academy revealed that he had been nominated every single year since 1993.

Tranströmer's wife, Monica, said he had been notified by telephone four minutes before the announcement was made. The Nobel Committee stated that Tranströmer's work received the prize "because, through his condensed, translucent images, he gives us fresh access to reality."

Permanent secretary of the Swedish Academy Peter Englund said, "He's been writing poetry since 1951 when he made his debut. And has quite a small production, really. He's writing about big questions. He's writing about death, he's writing about history and memory, and nature." Prime Minister of Sweden Fredrik Reinfeldt said he was "happy and proud" at the news of Tranströmer's achievement. Meanwhile, international response to the award has been mixed. The prize announcement led to the immediate reissuing of at least two volumes of Tranströmer's poetry.

References

External links
Prize announcement 2011 nobelprize.org
Award Ceremony nobelprize.org
Award ceremony speech nobelprize.org

2011